Suleeporn Laomi (Thai:ศุลีพร เลาหมี่, born 22 January 1998) is a Thai cricketer. She played for the Thailand women's national cricket team in the 2017 Women's Cricket World Cup Qualifier in February 2017. In the tournament, she was the highest wicket-taker for Thailand, with 4 dismissals.

In June 2018, she was named in Thailand's squad for the 2018 ICC Women's World Twenty20 Qualifier tournament. She made her Women's Twenty20 International (WT20I) debut for Thailand on 3 June 2018, in the 2018 Women's Twenty20 Asia Cup.

In August 2019, she was named in Thailand's squad for the 2019 ICC Women's World Twenty20 Qualifier tournament in Scotland. In October 2019, she was named in the Women's Global Development Squad, ahead of a five-match series in Australia. In January 2020, she was named in Thailand's squad for the 2020 ICC Women's T20 World Cup in Australia. In November 2021, she was named in Thailand's team for the 2021 Women's Cricket World Cup Qualifier tournament in Zimbabwe. She played in Thailand's first match of the tournament, on 21 November 2021 against Zimbabwe.

In October 2022, she played for Thailand in Women's Twenty20 Asia Cup.

References

External links

 

1998 births
Living people
Suleeporn Laomi
Suleeporn Laomi
Suleeporn Laomi
Suleeporn Laomi
Cricketers at the 2014 Asian Games
Suleeporn Laomi
Southeast Asian Games medalists in cricket
Competitors at the 2017 Southeast Asian Games
Suleeporn Laomi